The Legend of Sir Robert Charles Griggs is the first album by Sir Robert Charles Griggs, former Nashville musician and now a resident of Hemet, California. The album, featuring original songs in a unique alt-country style, was released in 1973.  Only released on vinyl, this album is somewhat of a rare find. A single of Fabulous Body and Smile was released concurrently on a 45 rpm record.

Track listing
 Fabulous Body and Smile (3:40)
 West Coast Billy (1:45)
 Cricket Convsersation Interlude (:12)
 Singing for the Lord (2:43)
 Moogie Woogie (:06)
 Sing My Old Songs to Somebody New (1:38)
 Vh1-V Hamp-Thieu (2:45)
 Sideman Talks to God (5:12)
 Keep It Country (2:32)
 Birds (:10)
 In L.A. (3:35)
 Heartbeats and Death Gasp (:14)
 Country Soul (4:38)
 Freak-Out Moog (:06)
 Uncle Ned (1:37)
 Clint Texas (4:35)

Album credits
Producer - Gary Paxton

Engineer - Scotty Moore

 Kenny Malone  - Drums
 Martha McCrory  - Strings
 Weldon Myrick  - Guitar (Steel)
 Jeff Newman  - Guitar (Steel)
 Gary Paxton  - Guitar
 Marvin Shantry  - Strings
 Steven Maxwell Smith  - Strings
 Henry Strzelecki  - Bass
 Gary VanOsdale  - Strings
 Reggie Young  - Guitar
 Pete Drake  - Guitar (Steel)
 Bobby Wood  - Piano
 Martin Katahn  - Strings
 Sir Robert Charles Griggs  - Main Performer
 Brenton Banks  - violin
 Larry Butler  - Piano
 Jimmy Capps  - Guitar
 Charles Cochran  - Piano, Arranger
 Tommy Cogbill  - Bass
 Jim Colvard  - Guitar
 Shane Keister  - Synthesizer
 Sheldon Kurland  - Strings
 Mike Leech  - Bass
 Doug Kershaw  - Fiddle, Concertina

References

1973 albums
Sir Robert Charles Griggs albums